Niède Guidon (born 12 March 1933) is a Brazilian archaeologist known for her work in pre-historic archeology of South American civilizations and her efforts to secure the conservation of the World Heritage Site Serra da Capivara National Park.

Educated in Brazil and France, she worked in Paris for most of her career. She was the founding president of the Fundação Museu do Homem Americano (American Man Museum Foundation), a non-profit organization created to support the Serra da Capivara National Park, a World Heritage Site. In 2005, she was one of the 1000 women nominated for the Nobel Peace Prize.

Since the early 1970s, Guidon has conducted archeological research in Southeast Piauí, where thousands of archeological sites have been discovered. Her dates from those sites indicate that human settlement preceded North America's Clovis people by tens of thousands of years. In the late 1980s, these findings challenged the mainstream theory of Clovis First and have generated debate in the academic archeology community.

Guidon has won several national and international awards, including the Prince Claus Award, and the Ford conservation and Environment award.

Career
Guidon was born in 1933 in Jaú, in the state of São Paulo, Brazil. She moved to São Paulo, where she studied Natural History at the University of São Paulo and subsequently worked for the Ipiranga Museum. In 1964, she was targeted by the Brazilian military dictatorship, which persecuted and tortured alleged communist scholars and students. To escape persecution, she moved to France, where she completed a Ph.D. in prehistory at the Sorbonne University with André Leroi-Gourhan and Annette Laming-Emperaire, became a researcher at the French National Centre for Scientific Research (CNRS) in Paris from 1966 to 1977, and a professor at the School for Advanced Studies in the Social Sciences in Paris.

Association with Serra de Capivara

Archaeological activities
In 1963, Guidon organized an exhibition of prehistoric paintings at the Ipiranga Museum. She was approached by a visitor from Serra da Capivara, who showed her photographs of rock art from rock shelters in the area. Guidon recognized that the paintings were significantly different from any known at that time, and was struck by their diversity and abundance. A few years later, Guidon visited the rock shelters at Piauí herself, and began research in the area in 1973. In 1978, she convinced the French government to establish an archeological mission to study prehistory in Piauí. Guidon led a mission composed of national and international researchers and local field assistants until her retirement, at which point Eric Boëda, a researcher at the CNRS and professor at the Université Paris, took over at her invitation.

In 1978, Guidon and other researchers petitioned the Brazilian government to create a protected area in the Serra da Capivara region. The Serra da Capivara National Park was created in 1979, encompassing an area protected by UNESCO, but the legislation has received little investment for its implementation.

As the head archaeologist at the park, Guidon was responsible for the preservation, development and management of archaeological projects in the park. She and her colleagues have discovered more than 800 pre-historic sites revealing occupation of the Americas by human beings, of which more than 600 are accompanied by paintings. In Pedra Furada, Guidon and her colleagues excavated an archaeological rock art site to uncover evidence of a Paleoindian culture they believe to be as old as c. 30,000 years B.P., significantly predating previous theories of the first habitation of the area by early Americans. She has recorded over 35,000 archaeological images and published multiple papers and books.

Her findings were first brought into the spotlight in 1986 with a publication in the British magazine Nature, in which she claimed to have discovered 32,000-year-old hearths and human artifacts. Although such early dates have not been generally accepted, Guidon and her colleagues have shown that the area was occupied by Paleoindian and Archaic rock art cultures subsisting on broad-spectrum hunting and gathering. In 1988 she began a partnership with the Brazilian Institute of Environment and Renewable Natural Resources (IBAMA), to facilitate the continuation of her excavations.

Pedra Furada 

Guidon's most famous prehistoric site is the Toca do Boqueira de Pedra Furada, located near São Raimundo Nonato in the Serra de Capivara park. Pedra Furada is a rock shelter 55 feet (17 m) deep; its walls are painted with more than 1,150 pre-historic images. Guidon has found thousands of artifacts here that could suggest human handiwork, and discovered a structure resembling a bonfire equipped with arranged logs and stones that she believes date back 48,700 years. She has suggested that humans reached Brazil about 100,000 years ago, probably by boat from Africa. The plant and animal remains recovered from the c. 10,000-year-old levels of this site and from comparable levels of another rock shelter in the Serra, the Perna site, show that the area was more humid and more forested than today. Michael R. Waters, a geoarchaeologist at Texas A&M University, noted the absence of genetic evidence in modern populations to support Guidon's claim.

Community work
In response to the growing threat to the integrity of local ecosystems and rock art, the same group of researchers founded the non-profit organization Fundação Museo do Homem Americano (FUMDHAM) (American Man Museum Foundation) to manage and protect the National Park and develop its surrounding rural communities. Guidon was the president of FUMDHAM from its creation in 1986 until 2020.

In 1990, Guidon moved from Paris to São Raimundo Nonato, Piauí, the gateway community of the Serra da Capivara National Park, where she has lived since. As president of FUMDHAM, she was involved in creating two museums, the American Man Museum and Nature's museum, a research center, and several social projects in education, health care, and sustainable economic activities in rural communities, offering training in ecology, prehistory, and the restoration of archaeological artifacts. Guidon has also led petitions to build schools, successfully establishing five new schools in local communities with a teaching faculty from the University of São Paulo, which have since declined in activity due to the lack of governmental structure. She also started a ceramics business, Cerâmica de Capivara, which she turned over to local entrepreneurs when it began making a profit.

See also
Toca da Tira Peia
Pedra Furada

References

External links
Biography
Interview
The Rock Art of Pedra Furada - Archaeological research by Niède Guidon

Brazilian archaeologists
Living people
1933 births
University of Paris alumni
Recipients of the Great Cross of the National Order of Scientific Merit (Brazil)
People from Jaú
University of São Paulo alumni
Brazilian women archaeologists